"Desperately" is a song written by Bruce Robison and Monte Warden. Robison first recorded the song on his 1998 album Wrapped. It was later covered by American country music artist George Strait on his 2003 album Honkytonkville. Released in January 2004 as that album's third and final single, it peaked at number 6 on the Billboard country charts. Its B-side, "Honk If You Honky Tonk", peaked at number 45 based on unsolicited airplay.

Cover versions
The song was covered by Josh Turner featuring Maddie & Tae on Turner's 2020 album Country State of Mind.

Chart performance
"Desperately" debuted at number 56 on the U.S. Billboard Hot Country Singles & Tracks for the week of January 17, 2004.

Year-end charts

References

1998 songs
2004 singles
Country ballads
2000s ballads
Bruce Robison songs
George Strait songs
Josh Turner songs
Maddie & Tae songs
Song recordings produced by Tony Brown (record producer)
Songs written by Bruce Robison
MCA Nashville Records singles